The 2015–16 IUPUI Jaguars men's basketball team represented Indiana University – Purdue University Indianapolis during the 2015–16 NCAA Division I men's basketball season. The Jaguars, led by second-year head coach Jason Gardner, played their home games at Indiana Farmers Coliseum, and were members of The Summit League. They finished the season 13–19, 9–7 in Summit League play to finish in fourth place. They lost in the quarterfinals of The Summit League tournament to North Dakota State.

Roster

Schedule

|-
!colspan=9 style="background:#990000; color:white;"| Exhibition

|-
!colspan=9 style="background:#990000; color:white;"| Non-conference regular season

|-
!colspan=9 style="background:#990000; color:white;"| Summit League regular season

|-
!colspan=9 style="background:#990000; color:white;"| The Summit League tournament

References

IUPUI Jaguars men's basketball seasons
IUPUI
2015 in sports in Indiana
2016 in sports in Indiana